= Lewis Loom Centre =

Coordinates: 58°12′43″N 6°23′17″W

The Lewis Loom Centre is located in Stornoway, Lewis, in Scotland.

It was a famous visitor attraction and specialty shop located at 3 Bayhead, Stornoway on the Isle of Lewis, Scotland. Run for many years by local expert Ronnie Mackenzie, it operated as an "Aladdin's cave" for authentic Harris Tweed, fabric remnants, and traditional clothing.

The Lewis Loom Centre was permanently closed in September 2022 following the passing of its owner and weaver, Ronnie Mackenzie.
